Daily Grind could refer to:

 The Daily Grind (EP), a 1993 EP by punk rock band No Use for a Name
 A slang term for employment
 A slang term for coffee
 A song by Little Feat from the 1990 album Representing the Mambo
 A webcomic by American author Michael H. Payne
 A website containing news and political stories thedailygrind.news